Derrick Johnson (born February 9, 1982) is a former American football cornerback. He was drafted by the San Francisco 49ers in the sixth round of the 2005 NFL Draft. He played college football at  Washington.
As a rookie, Johnson played in 14 games, starting in 5, recording 41 total tackles, 1 sack, 4 passes defended and 1 fumble recovered, which he returned a Marcel Shipp fumble 78 yards for a touchdown against Arizona, Oct 2, 2005 in Mexico City. 

Johnson has also been a member of the Houston Texans, Atlanta Falcons, Miami Dolphins, Seattle Seahawks and Saskatchewan Roughriders.

Early years
Johnson attended Notre Dame High School in Riverside, California where he lettered in football and also competed in track. As a senior in 1999, Johnson rushed for 1,990 yards with 39 touchdowns, and also had 586 yards receiving. For his efforts, he was the De Anza League most valuable player as well as all-CIF, all-county and Small Schools all-state selections.

Coming out of high school, Johnson was a member of the Tacoma News-Tribune 's "Western 100" and a PrepStar All-Region pick at running back. He was ranked by PrepStar as the No. 9 running back in the West Region and ranked 37th in SuperPrep's California/Hawaii/Nevada 152.

Post playing career
Johnson took up coaching after his playing days ended, coaching at California Military Institute, Canyon Springs High School and then at his alma mater, Notre Dame. In 2015, Johnson led the Titans to an undefeated 14-0 CIF SS Northwest Division Championship. The team also appeared in a state bowl game, the first time in school history. After two League championships, Johnson would resign and ultimately take on an assistant position at San Bernardino Valley College.

See also
 Washington Huskies football statistical leaders

External links
Saskatchewan Roughriders bio
Washington Huskies bio

1982 births
Living people
Sportspeople from Riverside, California
American football cornerbacks
Washington Huskies football players
San Francisco 49ers players
Houston Texans players
Atlanta Falcons players
Miami Dolphins players
Seattle Seahawks players
Saskatchewan Roughriders players
Players of American football from Riverside, California
Players of Canadian football from California